The 2016 Metro Atlantic Athletic Conference baseball tournament was held from May 25 through 29. The top six regular season finishers of the league's eleven teams met in the double-elimination tournament, which was held at Dutchess Stadium in Wappingers Falls, New York. As tournament champion, Fairfield earned the conference's automatic bid to the 2016 NCAA Division I baseball tournament.

Seeding
The top six teams were seeded one through six based on their conference winning percentage. They then played a double-elimination tournament.

Results

All-Tournament Team
The following players were named to the All-Tournament Team.

Most Valuable Player
Jake Salpietro was named Tournament Most Valuable Player.

References

Tournament
Metro Atlantic Athletic Conference Baseball Tournament
2016 in sports in New York (state)